Guru ki Maseet, also known as Guru's Mosque, is a historical mosque (Punjabi: Masīta) that was constructed by sixth Sikh Guru, Guru Hargobind Sahib at request of local Muslims of Sri Hargobindpur. Situated in Sri Hargobindpur town on the banks of River Beas, it is recognized as a historic site by UNESCO.

History
In December, 1634 Guru Hargobind Sahib fought a fierce battle against Mughal forces near the River Beas. Although heavily outnumbered, the Guru was victorious. Guru Sahib decided to stay there for a while, and soon a settlement grew up at this location. The settlement expanded into a town which became known as Sri Hargobindpur (-pur, being a suffix for "place of").

This mosque has existed in this location since the period of the sixth Guru.

Post-Independence of India
With the turmoil of the partitioning of India in 1947 and the mass movement of people, the mosque fell into a state of neglect and disrepair. In time the care of the maseet fell into the hands of a group a Nihang Singhs who installed the Sikh scripture Guru Granth Sahib in the one-time maseet. For many years, the mosque was maintained by Nihangs.

On 8 February 2001 a "Memorandum of Understanding" (MoU) was signed by Kirtan Singh, the chief of the Tarna Dal - the Sikh caretakers of the mosque, and the Punjab Waqf Board and Muslims perform their prayers at the mosque. Dr. Mohammed Rizwan-ul-Haq, Punjab Waqf Board Administrator, described the MoU as an international event which would pave the way for strengthening communal harmony in the country.

Restoration work began in 2010 by local Sikhs to renovate the structure.

References

Gurdwaras in Punjab, India
Gurdaspur